Ramandeep Singh (born 27 June 1991 in Amritsar, Punjab) is a Professional Indian footballer who currently plays as a defender for Trau FC in the I-League.

Career

Air India
After spending his youth with Tata Football Academy and Mumbai F.C. Singh signed for Air India FC in the I-League and made his first professional start for the club on 24 November 2011 against Pune F.C. at the Balewadi Sports Complex in which Air India lost 2-0.

Eagles
On 5 December 2013 it was announced that Ramandeep has signed up with Eagles F.C. of Kerala on loan for 2013-14 season along with Nadong Bhutia, Bijendra Rai, Avinabo Bag, Jagroop Singh, Bisheshwor Singh, Biswajit Saha and Govin Singh. Moreover, IMG-Reliance, the organisers of the proposed IPL-style football tournament Indian Super League, and Eagles F.C. will facilitate a two to six week training stint for the eight players with UK based Reading F.C. Academy.

Career statistics

Club
Statistics accurate as of 12 May 2013

Honours

Club
Air India
 Durand Cup: 2012

References

Indian footballers
I-League players
1988 births
Living people
Kerala Blasters FC players
Sportspeople from Amritsar
Footballers from Punjab, India
Air India FC players
Indian Super League players
Association football defenders
Kerala Blasters FC draft picks